Edward Erskholme Clive (28 August 1879 – 6 June 1940) was a Welsh stage actor and director who had a prolific acting career in Britain and America. He also played numerous supporting roles in Hollywood movies between 1933 and his death.

Biography 
E. E. Clive was born on 28 August 1879 in Blaenavon in Monmouthshire. He attended Pembroke Preparatory School and the University of Wales. His father, a minister, opposed Clive's becoming an actor. Clive studied for a medical career, and had completed four years of medical studies at St Bartholomew's Hospital before switching his focus to acting at age 22. Touring the provinces for a decade, Clive became an expert at virtually every sort of regional dialect in the British Isles. He moved to the U.S. in 1912, where after working in the Orpheum vaudeville circuit he set up his own stock company in Boston. By the 1920s, his company was operating in Hollywood; among his repertory players were such up-and-comers as Rosalind Russell. He also worked at the Broadway in several plays. Clive's obituary in The New York Times stated that he acted in  "1,159 Legitimate Plays Before Going into Moving Pictures".

Clive made his film debut as a village police constable in 1933's The Invisible Man with Claude Rains, then spent the next seven years showing up in wry supporting and bit parts, where he often portrayed comical versions of English stereotypes, sometimes also as a humourless authority figure. He often played butlers, reporters, aristocrats, shopkeepers and cabbies during his short film career. Though his roles were often small, Clive was a well-known and prolific character actor of his time. Among his best-known roles was the incompetent Burgomaster in James Whale's horror classic Bride of Frankenstein (1935). He was a semi-regular as 'Tenny the Butler' in Paramount Pictures' Bulldog Drummond "B" series starring John Howard; he also played butlers in other movies like Bachelor Mother with David Niven and Ginger Rogers. In 1939, Clive appeared in The Little Princess as the lawyer Mr. Barrows, and the first two entries of the classic Sherlock Holmes series starring Basil Rathbone. One of Clive's last roles was Sir William Lucas in the 1940 literature adaption Pride and Prejudice (1940) with Laurence Olivier and Greer Garson.

Clive died on 6 June 1940, of a heart ailment, in his Hollywood home. Clive was a member of the Euclid lodge of Freemasons in Boston.

Complete filmography 

Cheaters at Play (1932) – Steward
Horse Play (1933) – Scotland Yard Officer (uncredited)
The Invisible Man (1933) – Constable Jaffers
Long Lost Father (1934) – Spot Hawkins
The Poor Rich (1934) – Lord Fetherstone
Riptide (1934) – Major Mills (uncredited)
One More River (1934) – Chayne
Bulldog Drummond Strikes Back (1934) – Bobby With Mustache
Charlie Chan in London (1934) – Detective Sergeant Thacker
The Gay Divorcee (1934) – Chief Customs Inspector (uncredited)
Father Brown, Detective (1934) – Sergeant Dawes
The Little Minister (1934) – Sheriff Greer (uncredited)
Tin Pants (1934)
David Copperfield (1935) – Sheriff's Man (uncredited)
The Mystery of Edwin Drood (1935) – Mayor Thomas Sapsea
Gold Diggers of 1935 (1935) – Westbrook – Thorpe's Chauffeur (uncredited)
Bride of Frankenstein (1935) – Burgomaster
We're in the Money (1935) – Jevons, Courtney's Butler
Atlantic Adventure (1935) – McIntosh
Page Miss Glory (1935) – Monogram Shirtmaker (uncredited)
Three Kids and a Queen (1935) – Coachman (uncredited)
A Feather in Her Hat (1935) – Higgins – Pub Proprietor (uncredited)
Remember Last Night? (1935) – Coroner's Photographer (uncredited)
The Man Who Broke the Bank at Monte Carlo (1935) – Waiter (uncredited)
Stars Over Broadway (1935) – Crane
Kind Lady (1935) – Gramophone Man (uncredited)
A Tale of Two Cities (1935) – Judge in 'Old Bailey'
Captain Blood (1935) – Clerk of the Court
The Widow from Monte Carlo (1935) – Lord Holloway
Sylvia Scarlett (1935) – Customs Inspector (uncredited)
The Dark Hour (1936) – Foot, the Butler
Little Lord Fauntleroy (1936) – Sir Harry Lorridaile
Love Before Breakfast (1936) – Yacht Captain (uncredited)
The Unguarded Hour (1936) – Lord Hathaway
Dracula's Daughter (1936) – Sergeant Wilkes
The King Steps Out (1936) – Tutor (uncredited)
Show Boat (1936) – London Producer (uncredited)
Trouble for Two (1936) – King
The Golden Arrow (1936) – Walker
Palm Springs (1936) – Morgan
Ticket to Paradise (1936) – Barkins
The White Angel (1936) – Dr. Smith, a Surgeon (uncredited)
Piccadilly Jim (1936) – London Gossip Editor Bill Mechan
Cain and Mabel (1936) – Charles Fendwick
Libeled Lady (1936) – Fishing Instructor
Isle of Fury (1936) – Dr. Hardy
All American Chump (1936) – J. Montgomery Brantley
The Charge of the Light Brigade (1936) – Sir Humphrey Harcourt
Tarzan Escapes (1936) – Masters
Lloyd's of London (1936) – Magistrate
Camille (1936) – Saint Gaudens (uncredited)
Bulldog Drummond Escapes (1937) – Tenny
On the Avenue (1937) – Cabby
They Wanted to Marry (1937) – Stiles
Maid of Salem (1937) – Bilge
Ready, Willing and Able (1937) – Sir Samuel Buffington (Credits) / Bloomington (in Film)
Personal Property (1937) – Cosgrove Dabney
Night Must Fall (1937) – Guide
The Road Back (1937) – General (uncredited)
The Emperor's Candlesticks (1937) – Auctioneer
Love Under Fire (1937) – Captain Bowden
Bulldog Drummond Comes Back (1937) – Tenny
Danger – Love at Work (1937) – Wilbur
It's Love I'm After (1937) – First Butler
The Great Garrick (1937) – Pictures Vendor (uncredited)
Live, Love and Learn (1937) – Mr. Palmiston
Beg, Borrow or Steal (1937) – Lord Nigel Braemer
Bulldog Drummond's Revenge (1937) – Tenny
Arsène Lupin Returns (1938) – Alf
The First Hundred Years (1938) – Chester Blascomb
Bulldog Drummond's Peril (1938) – Tenny
Kidnapped (1938) – Minister MacDougall
Bulldog Drummond in Africa (1938) – Tenny
Gateway (1938) – Room Steward
Submarine Patrol (1938) – British Officer (uncredited)
Arrest Bulldog Drummond (1938) – Tenny
The Last Warning (1938) – Major Barclay
Mr. Moto's Last Warning (1939) – Port Commandant General (uncredited)
The Little Princess (1939) – Mr. Barrows
I'm from Missouri (1939) – Mr. Arthur, Duke of Cricklewood
Bulldog Drummond's Secret Police (1939) – Tenny
The Hound of the Baskervilles (1939) – Cabby
Rose of Washington Square (1939) – Barouche Driver
Man About Town (1939) – Hotchkiss, Arlington's Butler
Bachelor Mother (1939) – Merlin's Butler
Bulldog Drummond's Bride (1939) – Tenny
The Adventures of Sherlock Holmes (1939) – Inspector Bristol
Raffles (1939) – Barraclough
The Honeymoon's Over (1939) – Col. Shelby
The Earl of Chicago (1940) – Mr. Redwood
Congo Maisie (1940) – Horace Snell
Adventure in Diamonds (1940) – Mr. MacPherson
Pride and Prejudice (1940) – Sir William Lucas
Foreign Correspondent (1940) – Mr. Naismith (uncredited)
Flowing Gold (1940) – Mr. Naismith (uncredited) (final film role)

References

External links

1879 births
1940 deaths
Welsh male film actors
Vaudeville performers
People from Monmouthshire
20th-century Welsh male actors
British expatriate male actors in the United States